Lambeth North was a borough constituency centred on the Lambeth district of South London.  It returned one Member of Parliament (MP) to the House of Commons of the Parliament of the United Kingdom, elected by the first past the post system.

History 

The constituency was created when the two-member Lambeth constituency was divided by the Redistribution of Seats Act 1885 for the 1885 general election.  It was abolished for the 1950 general election when the area was absorbed into the Vauxhall constituency.

Boundaries
1885 - 1918: The constituency was defined as comprising three wards of the parish of Lambeth: Bishop's, North Marsh and South Marsh. The wards were those used to elect members of the Lambeth Vestry, the local authority established by the Metropolis Management Act 1855.
1918 - 1950: The Representation of the People Act 1918 reorganised constituencies in London, defining them in terms of the wards of the Metropolitan Boroughs which had replaced the vestries in 1900. The constituency comprised the following parts of the Metropolitan Borough of Lambeth: Bishop's Ward, Marsh Ward and the part of Prince's Ward that lay "to the north of a line running from Vauxhall Bridge along the middle of Upper Kennington Lane and Lower Kennington Lane to Newington Butts".

Members of Parliament

Election results

Elections in the 1880s

Elections in the 1890s

Elections in the 1900s

Elections in the 1910s

Elections in the 1920s

Elections in the 1930s

Elections in the 1940s

References

Parliamentary constituencies in London (historic)
Constituencies of the Parliament of the United Kingdom established in 1885
Constituencies of the Parliament of the United Kingdom disestablished in 1950
Politics of the London Borough of Lambeth